The Western Australian Party (WAP) was a short-lived Australian political party that operated in 1906. It was intended as a liberal party to protect the rights of Western Australians and to oppose the increasingly successful Labor Party, and drew its supporters from the Protectionist Party and the Anti-Socialist Party. John Forrest, a minister in Alfred Deakin's government, accepted the leadership of the party. Candidates were endorsed for all electorates in the 1906 federal election, including Forrest, but by the time of the election enthusiasm for the venture had diffused. The party elected Forrest in Swan and William Hedges in Fremantle. In practice they sat as independents and joined the Commonwealth Liberal Party when it formed.

References

Further reading

Defunct political parties in Australia
Australia 1906
Defunct political parties in Western Australia
Political parties established in 1906
1906 establishments in Australia
1906 disestablishments in Australia
Political parties disestablished in 1906